Rudnik Wielki is a village in the administrative district of Gmina Kamienica Polska, within Częstochowa County, Silesian Voivodeship, in southern Poland.

The village has a population of 862.

References

Rudnik Wielki